NFL Teacher of the Year is an award given by the National Football League. When the award began in 1990, it was to award a teacher who "had the single greatest impact on [a player's] educational and life-skills development" but starting in 2010 it has been awarded to former players who have gone on to succeed as teachers themselves.

NFL Teachers of the Year (teachers who taught players)

2007 Jacquelyn Stevens (Washington-Marion Magnet School)

NFL Teachers of the Year (players turned teachers)

1991 Miriam Williams (Palmetto Middle School)
1994 Terry Lowe (Greenwich High)
2010 
2011 Burt Grossman (Hoover High School)
2012 Brent McClanahan (South High School)
2013 Frank Beede (Freedom High School)
2014

References

Awards established in 1990
National Football League trophies and awards